The list of fatal World Rally Championship accidents consists of drivers and co-drivers who have died at FIA World Rally Championship (WRC) rallies. The list also includes fatal accidents in the International Championship for Manufacturers (IMC), the predecessor to the World Rally Championship, which was contested from 1970 to 1972. Well-known fatalities involving officials, spectators and team members are also mentioned.

The fatal accidents of the Group B era resulted in its demise. Only hours after Henri Toivonen's crash at the 1986 Tour de Corse, FISA president Jean-Marie Balestre announced that Group B cars were banned for the 1987 season. However, driver fatalities peaked in 1989, when five competitors died in the first three rallies of the season (two during reconnaissance, two who were spectating having only done reconnaissance for the event, and only one as an active competitor). Markko Märtin's co-driver Michael Park's death at the 2005 Wales Rally GB was the WRC's first fatality in over eleven years.

Drivers and co-drivers fatalities

IMC

WRC

Other fatalities

Team members
At the 1975 Safari Rally, a service car with four mechanics crashed into a truck near Mombasa. Carlino Dacista, Brian Fernandez and Willie Uis died instantly. The driver David Joshi sustained serious injuries. At the 1978 Monte Carlo Rally, two mechanics, Bernard Balmer and Georges Reinier, died when their van collided with a truck near Gap, Hautes-Alpes. On the second day of the 1987 Rallye Côte d'Ivoire, Toyota Team Europe's Cessna 340 crashed and exploded, killing all four inside; manager and former co-driver Henry Liddon, his assistant Nigel Harris, the pilot and the navigator. Team manager Ove Andersson withdrew Toyota from the event. Prior to the accident, Björn Waldegård and Fred Gallagher had been running second in their Toyota Supra Turbo. At the 1996 Safari Rally, competed in bad weather and rain, three British mechanics drowned while attempting to cross a river with their Land Rover.

Officials
At the end of the fourth stage of the 1981 1000 Lakes Rally, Audi Sport driver Franz Wittmann and his co-driver Kurt Nestinger did not notice the flying finish which marks the end of the stage. They continued at race speed with their Quattro and crashed into a group of people standing in front of a van. Raul Falin, chairman of AKK, Finland's sporting authority for motorsport and the country's representative in the FIA, was quickly taken to a hospital but died from his injuries soon after. Boris Rung, co-founder and chairman of the European Rallycross Association and member of FIA's Off-Road Commission, survived the accident along with Greek FIA observer Costas Glossotis.

Spectators
At the 1978 Safari Rally, five passers-by and four spectators were killed in unrelated accidents, both involving non-competitive drivers crashing into competitors.

On the first stage of the 1986 Rally Portugal, Joaquim Santos lost control of his Ford RS200 while trying to avoid spectators on the road, crashing into a crowd of spectators, killing three and injuring over thirty. All the factory teams – Audi, Austin Rover, Ford, Lancia, Peugeot and Volkswagen – withdrew from the event.

At the 1996 1000 Lakes Rally, at a special stage that took place in the centre of Jyväskylä, one spectator died and 36 were injured when Danish driver Karsten Richardt lost control of his Mitsubishi Lancer Evolution.

At the 2017 Monte Carlo Rally, a spectator died after Hayden Paddon slid wide on a left-hand corner and went rear-first on the roadside embankment.

Notes

References

Fatal accidents
World Rally Championship